Saint Droctoveus (or Droctonius, Droctovée, Droctovius, Drote, Drottoveo, Drotté) was a Frankish abbot, the first abbot of what became Saint Germain-des-Pres in Paris.

Life

The oldest account of Drottoveo's life was written by his contemporary Venantius Fortunatus in chapter XI of the 1.IX of his Carmina (Songs).
A Life was lost after the raids of the Normans, who set fire to the monastery of Saint Vincent in Paris in 845 and again in 857.
A monk named Gislemaro of the monastery of Saint Vincent wrote an account between 841 and 847 based on oral testimony, but it has little value.

Droctoveus was born around 530.
He became a monk and disciple of Saint Germain of Paris.
He became abbot of the Abbey of Saint-Symphorien, Autun, and was then appointed first abbot of Saint Vincent, later known as Saint Germain-des-Pres in Paris.
He died around 580 of natural causes.
His feast day is 10 March.

Monks of Ramsgate account

The monks of St Augustine's Abbey, Ramsgate, wrote in their Book of Saints (1921),

Butler's account

The hagiographer Alban Butler ( 1710–1773) wrote in his Lives of the Fathers, Martyrs, and Other Principal Saints, under March 10,

Notes

Sources

 

6th-century Frankish saints
530 births
580 deaths